Emergency medical services in Iran began in Tehran in 1974. Iran EMS named Emergency Information Center and started Call help to people with a limited number of ambulances and trained technicians. 115 was the number of Iran emergency call. After Tehran in other cities such as Isfahan, Shiraz and Mashhad set up emergency medical services.

Currently, 14,000 EMTs and doctors work in Iranian emergency centers. This system uses the ambulance type B, ambulance type C, helicopter, motorcycle ambulances and sea ambulances. Prehospital Emergency has an important role in disaster health management and assistance to victims.

References

https://web.archive.org/web/20140220091702/http://demmc.behdasht.gov.ir/
http://ems.mui.ac.ir

Medical and health organisations based in Iran
Iran
Emergency services in Iran